ISW may refer to:
Sachs–Wolfe effect#Integrated Sachs–Wolfe effect
Institute for the Study of War
International School Winterthur